Shoop Shoop may refer to:

 "Exhale (Shoop Shoop)," a Whitney Houston song
 "The Shoop Shoop Song (It's in His Kiss)," a song written by Rudy Clark
 Shoop Shoop Diddy Wop Cumma Cumma Wang Dang, a single by Monte Video and the Cassettes